James Woodall (born February 1, 1994) is an American Baptist minister, politician and activist. Woodall is the former President of the Georgia NAACP.

Early life and education

James Woodall was born in Riverdale, Georgia in 1994. He was a member of the ROTC in high school. He earned an undergraduate degree from Georgia Southern University (GSU) in 2016. While attending GSU, he was worked for Francys Johnson as a legal assistant. He completed his master's at the Interdenominational Theological Center at Morehouse College.

Career

Woodall is a former intelligence analyst for the United States Army. He served in the Army for eight years and left as a sergeant. He currently serves as a minister at Pleasant Grove Missionary Church in Marietta, Georgia. Woodall is also a legislative aide to Georgia state representative Miriam Paris.

Politics and activism
Woodall became active in the NAACP in 2015 after the deaths of Eric Garner and Trayvon Martin. He graduated from the NAACP's Next-Gen leadership program. During that time, he was president of the state's youth and college program and also vice president of the Bulloch County NAACP. He was elected president of the Georgia state NAACP in October 2019, making him the youngest Georgia NAACP president in the organization's history.

In the wake of the 2020 United States presidential election in Georgia, Georgia Secretary of State Brad Raffensperger created a bipartisan election task force, in October, to improve voting systems and law in the state. Woodall was named to the task force. On December 30, 2020, Woodall quit the task force calling it a "farce", that "it's all for show," and that no actions have taken place despite numerous task force meetings.

References

External links

"Protest March In Atlanta To Call Out Systematic Criminal Justice Failures", an interview with Woodall on NPR
"Officer Who Killed Rayshard Brooks Faces Felony Murder Charges — But 'We Still Have A Long Way To Go,' Georgia NAACP President Says", an interview with Woodall on Here and Now

Year of birth uncertain
Living people
African-American Baptist ministers
21st-century Baptist ministers from the United States
21st-century American politicians
African-American people in Georgia (U.S. state) politics
NAACP activists
People from Clayton County, Georgia
Georgia Southern University alumni
Morehouse College alumni
United States Army non-commissioned officers
21st-century African-American politicians
1994 births